Jacob Ballard (born  26 February 1994) is a current Coburg Football Club player and a former professional Australian rules footballer who played for the Fremantle Football Club in the Australian Football League (AFL).

Drafted with the 47th selection in the 2014 Rookie Draft from Northern Blues in the Victorian Football League (VFL), he played for Peel Thunder in the West Australian Football League (WAFL), Fremantle's reserve team during the 2014 and 2015 seasons.

Ballard made his AFL debut for Fremantle in the final round of the 2015 AFL season, when Fremantle sent a weakened team to play Port Adelaide at Adelaide Oval.  Twelve changes were made to the team, and Ballard was one of four players to make their AFL debuts. He was delisted at the conclusion of the 2015 season.  One day after being delisted by Fremantle, Ballard was awarded the Tuckey Medal as the best and fairest player for Peel Thunder in 2015.

VFL career
Ballard was named on the interchange of the VFL's Team of the Year while playing for Richmond in 2017. In 2019 he won a VFL premiership with Richmond.
In November 2019, Ballard agreed to a 1 year agreement with the Coburg Football Club.

References

External links

WAFL Player Profile and Statistics

1994 births
Living people
Fremantle Football Club players
Peel Thunder Football Club players
Preston Football Club (VFA) players
Coburg Football Club players
Australian rules footballers from Victoria (Australia)